Sylvester Antolak (September 10, 1918 – May 24, 1944) was a United States Army Sergeant who posthumously received the Medal of Honor for actions on May 24, 1944. Sergeant Antolak was an American of Polish descent. He joined the army from his hometown in July 1941.During the Allied invasion of Italy, Sergeant Antolak fought relentlessly to overtake German defenses near Cisterna di Littoria, where he was shot and killed. Despite being shot three times and suffering a broken arm, he continued to push towards a Wehrmacht Machine-Gun, leading his men to overtake their positions.

To Hell And Back
In his book, To Hell And Back, fellow Medal of Honor recipient Audie L. Murphy refers to Antolak as "Lutsky" and provides the following account of his heroism:

"We roll over the wall and find ourselves in the range of two enemy strong points. But for the moment, the krauts are ignoring us. They are absorbed in trying to split the two groups of men that preceded us.

A sergeant in the first platoon senses the predicament. If his men are isolated, they will likely be destroyed. He makes his decision quickly. Motioning his men to follow, he rises and with a submachine gun charges head-on toward one of the enemy positions two hundred yards away.

On the flat, coverless terrain, his body is a perfect target. A blast of automatic fire knocks him down. He springs to his feet with a bleeding shoulder and continues his charge. The guns rattle. Again he goes down.

Fascinated, we watch as he gets up for the third time and dashes straight into the enemy fire. The Germans throw everything they have at him. He falls to the earth; and when he again pulls himself to his feet, we see that his right arm is shattered. But wedging his gun under his left armpit, he continues firing and staggers forward. Ten horrified Germans throw down their guns and yell "Kamerad".

That is all I see. But later I learn that the sergeant, ignoring the pleas of his men to get under cover and wait for medical attention, charged the second enemy strongpoint. By sheer guts, he advanced sixty yards before being stopped by a final concentration of enemy fire. He reeled, then tottered forward another few yards before falling.

Inspired by his valor and half-insane with rage, his men took over, stormed the kraut emplacement, and captured it. When they returned to their leader, he was dead.

This was how Lutsky, the sergeant, helped buy the freedom that we cherish and abuse."

Awards and decorations

Medal of Honor

Commendations
SGT Antolak's awards include the following:

Legacy

 The USNS Sgt. Sylvester Antolak (T-AP-192) was named after Sgt. Sylvester Antolak.
 In 2017, a section of Interstate 70 that runs through Belmont County, Ohio near Sgt. Antolak's hometown of St. Clairsville was renamed the "Sgt. Sylvester Antolak Highway." The section of Interstate 70 that is named the Sgt. Sylvester Antolak Highway actually is located on the property where the Antolak family home was located.
 The first episode of the 2018 Netflix series Medal of Honor features Sgt. Antolak, played by actor Joseph Cross.
 In 2009, Antolak's great nephew, Cole Antolak, dedicated his Eagle Scout project to developing a monument honoring his great uncle.  It is located in St. Clairesville, Ohio in Belmont County.

See also
List of Medal of Honor recipients
List of Medal of Honor recipients for World War II

References

1916 births
1944 deaths
United States Army Medal of Honor recipients
United States Army personnel killed in World War II
American people of Polish descent
United States Army non-commissioned officers
People from St. Clairsville, Ohio
World War II recipients of the Medal of Honor